Black Noir, or simply Noir, is the name of three superhero characters from the comic book series The Boys, created by Garth Ennis and Darick Robertson, and the television series and franchise of the same name, developed by Eric Kripke. In both the comic and TV series, Noir is a member of the hedonistic and reckless Vought-American superhero group the Seven and is depicted as a "silent ninja" type parody of Batman, Snake Eyes and Deathstroke.

In the comic series, Noir is revealed to be a clone of Homelander, created to replace him if he ever went rogue. Driven insane by a lack of purpose, Noir resolved to frame Homelander for various atrocities as part of a plan to gradually drive him insane and replace him. However, he is ultimately killed by Homelander and Billy Butcher. In the TV series adaption, Noir, portrayed by Nathan Mitchell and Fritzy-Klevans Destine, is instead depicted as a brain-damaged black Supe named Earving, who is loyal to Vought CEO Stan Edgar. In The Boys Presents: Diabolical, Noir is depicted guiding Homelander in his early career. Following Earving's death in the third season finale of the main series, Kripke confirmed in July 2022 that Mitchell would portray a replacement Noir in the upcoming fourth season of the series.

Appearances

Comic book series

In the comic series, Black Noir is depicted as a member of the superhero team, The Seven, and the only superhuman created by Vought-American who can beat Homelander in arm-wrestling. Until the events of the series' climax, it is implied that Homelander had raped Billy Butcher's wife, Becky, who then died giving birth to a superhuman baby Butcher had then killed. In Issue #40, the Boys receive a series of incriminating photos seemingly showing Homelander engaging in grisly acts of murder, cannibalism, and necrophilia against men, women, and children. The series eventually reveals that Homelander cannot remember either these incidents or the rape of Butcher's wife, and suggests that Homelander has dissociative identity disorder and may have sent the photographs to Butcher himself. In private, Homelander shows signs of suffering a mental breakdown, talking to his own reflection in a mirror, and having bouts of nausea over the images, genuinely confused and horrified by their contents, events which a secretly watching Frenchie decides to keep from Butcher. Deciding he is "damned" for the acts depicted in the photos, Homelander decides to give in to any intrusive thoughts that cross his mind.

Following Herogasm, in which Black Noir randomly "thumbs up" Wee Hughie's posterior while the latter was infiltrating an orgy, Homelander resolves to free himself and the superhero community from Vought-American's control, leading the other superheroes in a coup d'etat against the United States, launching an attack on the White House and killing everyone inside, including the Vought-controlled Vice President, under the guise of doing so for Vought. During the subsequent confrontation between Homelander and Butcher, surmising why Butcher must hate him, Black Noir arrives in the Oval Office and reveals himself to be a clone of Homelander created solely to kill and replace him if he ever went rogue. Gradually being driven insane due to not being allowed to kill Homelander, Noir reveals that he committed the atrocities documented in the photos and had raped Becky to set Butcher and Homelander against one another so that he would be given authorization to fulfill his purpose. Outraged, Homelander attacks Noir, who proceeds to tear Homelander apart. Before dying, Homelander manages to seriously injure his former teammate, allowing Butcher to later finish him off with a crowbar, before embarking on his own genocidal plan to kill all superheroes and those "Supes" with the genetic potential to become them.

One year later, the Guy from Vought (James Stillwell) turns down a pitch from his marketing department for a new rebranded all-white-clad Noir (and other Supes) — White Blanche — as a part of "True", consisting of regular Supes and various Supes brought back from death with a limited mental capacity by Compound V. Realizing that Compound V and Supes in general comprise "bad product", Stillwell begins to suffer a mental breakdown.

Television series

Earving

The Boys

In the live-action television adaptation, Black Noir is portrayed by Nathan Mitchell while Fritzey-Klevans Destine portrays Noir in flashbacks. Largely silent, he primarily communicates in a series of silent gestures and intimidating body language, and possesses a healing factor coupled with a penchant for artistic exploits, standing toe-to-toe with the Female and effortlessly playing classical music on a piano in the first season. In the second season, Noir is revealed to be the loyal enforcer of Vought CEO Stanford "Stan" Edgar, who directs his every action in combat, including killing the super-terrorist Naqib and tracking down Billy Butcher and the Boys. However, Noir also displays simple, friendly character traits of his own outside of combat, such as giving Naqib's son a teddy bear, befriending a Vought programmer while looking for Butcher, and breaking down in tears upon learning his powers originated from Compound V injections given to him by Vought with his parents' consent as a child. Later, while attempting to apprehend the then-rogue Starlight, Noir is put into a coma by Queen Maeve after she exploits his tree nut allergy by forcing him to consume an Almond Joy and kicking his Epi-pen out of reach, during which he is revealed to be black. 

In flashbacks to the Cold War depicted in the third season, Noir is revealed to be a man named Earving who had begun his superhero career and joined Payback, Vought's predecessor to the Seven. However, Noir and the rest of his teammates were subject to career sabotage and physical abuse by team leader Soldier Boy. In 1984, amidst a joint operation with the CIA to stop a communist government in Nicaragua, Edgar secretly assigned Payback to trade Soldier Boy to the Russian government so Vought can eventually replace him with Homelander, who had been conceived with sperm obtained from Soldier Boy. Throughout, Noir complained about having to wear a helmet that covers his face as he wanted to be the "Eddie Murphy" of superheroes, though Edgar told him Vought believed a publicly black superhero was neither profitable nor acceptable at the time. Amidst an attack on their camp by Nicaraguan and Russian soldiers, Noir led Payback in cornering and attacking Soldier Boy. They eventually succeeded in subduing him, though not before Soldier Boy left Noir permanently disfigured, mute, and brain damaged. In the present, upon coming out of his coma and learning of Soldier Boy's return to America, Noir cuts his tracking chip out of his arm and hides out in an abandoned Buster Beaver's Pizza Restaurant, where its mascots and his imaginary friends reenact the abuse he suffered from Soldier Boy and convince Noir to face him instead of running. Upon returning to Vought, Homelander kills Noir for withholding his knowledge of Soldier Boy being Homelander's biological father.

Seven on 7

In the 2021–2022 promotional web series Seven on 7 with Cameron Coleman, which bridges the events of the second and third seasons of the live-action adaptation, Noir is revealed to have awoken from his coma and been charged by Vought with tracking down numerous Supes that had escaped from a psychiatric hospital as well as filming promos for Vought's streaming service, Vought+, on which his film Black Noir: Insurrection is to be released.

Death Battle!

In the 2020 Amazon Prime Video-sponsored The Boys promotional episodes of Death Battle!, Black Noir gives up his place in participating in the Seven's battle royale to Billy Butcher, in favour of serving as one of the event's hosts alongside Wiz and Boomstick, with whom he communicates via a series of head and hand gestures. Noir subsequently reappears in Death Battle! as a recurring character and background comic relief.

Diabolical

In The Boys Presents: Diabolical prequel episode "One Plus One Equals Two", Black Noir is revealed to have been the "Homelander before Homelander", who Madelyn Stillwell sought to supplant, describing Noir as being built to destroy Homelander. After coming across a then-18-year-old Homelander after he accidentally killed several hostages and eco-terrorists on his first mission as a superhero, Black Noir evades Homelander's attempts to kill him before tricking him into destroying the compound they were in and mercy killing the last eco-terrorist in its aftermath to prevent Homelander from killing them both. Successfully gaining Homelander's trust, Black Noir writes him an excusatory speech to provide to the press outside, claiming the eco-terrorists had a bomb.

New Black Noir
Following Noir's death in the third season finale of the main series, Eric Kripke confirmed in July 2022 that Noir's actor Nathan Mitchell would portray a replacement Black Noir in the upcoming fourth season of the series; describing the character as a "whole new" and "really interesting and hilarious character".

Potential spin-off
In October 2020, following news of the development of several spin-off series of The Boys, Black Noir actor Nathan Mitchell expressed interest in a potential "Mr. Bean-style comedy" solo series focused on the character, tentatively entitled The Secret Life of Black Noir.

Powers and abilities
In the comics, Black Noir is a long-time member of the Seven, almost always shown in silhouette with his face obscured. His powers include super strength and supposed skills as a pilot. He is stronger than even Homelander; Mother's Milk states he can "[...] bench a dozen Mack trucks". While initially an enigma, it is revealed at the climax of the series that Black Noir is actually a clone of the Homelander, developed by Vought-American as a contingency, in case the leader of the Seven became a liability, and as such, has all of his powers, including heat vision, super strength, durability, flight, and enhanced vocal cords.

In the television series, Black Noir is depicted as a normal man imbued with Compound V. As a result, he gained superhuman strength, a regenerative healing factor and "silent ninja" aesthetic, with his only weakness being his tree nut allergy, in reference to both Superman's weakness to kryptonite and his actor Nathan Mitchell's real-life tree nut allergy.

Development
In September 2020, The Boys television adaptation's producer and showrunner Eric Kripke confirmed that despite the apparent foreshadowing of Homelander often comparing Black Noir to himself, that the plot twist of Noir being Homelander's clone, capable of killing him, would not be used, choosing instead to portray Black Noir as his own character and amalgamating the comics character's psychopathic traits with Homelander. Noir's role as a "failsafe" against Homelander was similarly supplanted by that of Homelander's son Ryan Butcher (primarily portrayed by Cameron Crovetti), a loose adaptation of the Supe baby killed by Butcher in the comic series after it killed his wife while she was giving birth to it, with Kripke saying:[W]hat makes Noir 'Noir' is he's just this complete cipher; like, you just don't know anything about him and he's just completely mysterious. But then he has these strange reactions, like he'll make the teddy bear dance, or he'll cry, and he'll reveal some vulnerabilities, emotional vulnerabilities. Then he'll just return to just being this completely still, horrifying Terminator of a character, and that's kind of what I like about him, I have to say. Every so often, it comes up like, 'We should really learn who he is.' And I'm like, 'But should we know? Isn't it more interesting that we just never really quite understand how he got that way?' So I think Noir definitely remains as mysterious as always.

On the third season reveal of the first Noir being a black Supe named Earving (portrayed by Fritzy-Klevans Destine) who had been "tasked by Stan Edgar to do away with Soldier Boy on Payback's Nicaragua mission [in 1984], which result[ed] in Soldier Boy searing Noir's face, after which he goes silent" from the resulting brain damage to become Edgar's unquestioning assassin by the present-day, who sees his imaginary friends as a result, Kripke stated that:"Young Noir grew up going to this pizza chain called Buster Beavers. It's like a Chuck E. Cheese. He sees the animated characters. They come to life and they have a lot of interaction with him. Like everything on the show, it's sort of this organic road to hell, I guess, We wanted to see Noir sort of Dark Night of the Soul. It's hard to do that because he doesn't communicate. We knew we had to go inside his head and someone pitched, like, he goes to a cabin. And I said, 'He should go to a cabin, but all these Snow White animated creatures should be flying around all over him' and that we strongly implied they've always been there. And then someone said, 'Well, it might be a little corny. What about like a Chuck E. Cheese?' So it just evolves." On the use of animation for Noir's imagination, inspired by his development of The Boys Presents: Diabolical, Kripke further revealed that "[w]e worked with this amazing [animation] company called 6 Point Harness, which did create all the animation for us [right at the level of real Disney hand-drawn animation]. But what I love about it most of all is it's definitely implied that for the entire run of the series, these characters just hang out with Noir. If you were to cut [back] into Noir's point of view [during the first two seasons], he'd have these animated characters that he's interacting with. And that just brings me no end of pleasure."

Merchandise
To promote the third season of The Boys, Amazon Prime Video licensed a line of Black Noir MAFEX action figures from NECA and the Japanese company MediCom Toy Incorporated.

Reception
Inspired by Batman, the character and Mitchell's portrayal in the series (considered a breakout character) have received critical acclaim.

The character has been compared to slasher film villains such as Jason Voorhees and Michael Myers, and to the Marvel Comics antihero Deadpool.

References

Comics characters introduced in 2006
American comics characters
African-American superheroes
The Boys characters
DC Comics American superheroes
Catholicism in fiction
Characters created by Garth Ennis
DC Comics characters who can move at superhuman speeds
DC Comics characters with accelerated healing
DC Comics characters with superhuman senses
DC Comics characters with superhuman strength
DC Comics supervillains
DC Comics male characters
DC Comics male supervillains
DC Comics martial artists
WildStorm supervillains
Dynamite Entertainment characters
Fictional black people
Fictional characters with fire or heat abilities
Fictional characters with nuclear or radiation abilities
Fictional characters with energy-manipulation abilities
Fictional characters with slowed ageing
Fictional characters with superhuman durability or invulnerability
Fictional characters with X-ray vision
Fictional murderers of children
Fictional cannibals
Fictional genetically engineered characters
Fictional knife-fighters
Fictional rapists
Fictional super soldiers
Fictional mass murderers
Fictional ninja
Narcissism in fiction
Parodies of Batman
Parodies of Superman
Clone characters in comics
WildStorm characters
WildStorm superheroes